Events from the year 1956 in Pakistan.

Incumbents

Federal government 

Queen Elizabeth II as Queen of Pakistan (until 23 March)
Governor-General: Iskander Mirza (until 23 March)
President: Iskander Mirza (starting 23 March)
Prime Minister: Chaudhry Muhammad Ali (until 12 September), Huseyn Shaheed Suhrawardy (starting 12 September)
Chief Justice: Muhammad Munir

Events

 March 23, Pakistan becomes the first Islamic republic in the world. Pakistan also becomes a Commonwealth republic (Republic Day in Pakistan)
 March 23, Iskander Mirza becomes the first President of Pakistan.
 September, Huseyn Shaheed Suhrawardy becomes Prime Minister of Pakistan.

See also

1955 in Pakistan
Other events of 1956
1957 in Pakistan
List of Pakistani films of 1956
Timeline of Pakistani history

References

 
1956 in Asia